Entrichella is a genus of moths in the family Sesiidae.

Species
Entrichella constricta (Butler, 1878)
Entrichella esakii (Yano, 1960)
Entrichella pogonias Bryk, 1947
Entrichella yakushimaensis (Arita, 1993)
Entrichella erythranches (Meyrick, 1926)
Entrichella fusca (Xu & Liu, 1992)
Entrichella gorapani (Arita & Gorbunov, 1995)
Entrichella hreblayi Petersen, 2001
Entrichella issikii (Yano, 1960)
Entrichella leiaeformis (Walker, 1856)
Entrichella linozona (Meyrick, 1926)
Entrichella meilinensis (Xu & Liu, 1993)
Entrichella simifusca (Xu & Liu, 1993)
Entrichella tricolor Kallies & Arita, 2001
Entrichella trifasciata (Yano, 1960)

References

Sesiidae